Hobart is a village in Delaware County, New York, United States. The population was 441 at the 2010 census. The village is in the town of Stamford and is on New York Route 10 in the northeastern part of the county.

History
The village of Hobart was originally named Waterville. When the modern village of Waterville, New York claimed the name in 1808, a new name was sought for the village on the Delaware River. In 1828, the name Hobart was selected, after Bishop John Henry Hobart, then the Bishop of the Episcopal Diocese of New York, who founded St. Peter's Episcopal Church in the village in September 1819. Bishop Hobart would visit the village again in 1827 before it was renamed. He planned to visit the newly renamed village of Hobart again in October 1830, but died in September 1830, before he could do so.

The Hobart Masonic Hall and the St. Peter's Episcopal Church Complex are listed on the National Register of Historic Places.

Hobart is noted for being a book village with six independent book stores.

Geography
Hobart is located in the north-central part of the town of Stamford at  (42.371251, -74.668481), along the upper reaches of the West Branch Delaware River.

Demographics

As of the census of 2000, there were 390 people, 151 households, and 104 families residing in the village. The population density was 763.8 people per square mile (295.3/km2). There were 200 housing units at an average density of 391.7 per square mile (151.4/km2). The racial makeup of the village was 94.36% White, 3.85% African American, 0.77% Native American, 0.51% Asian, and 0.51% from two or more races. Hispanic or Latino of any race were 0.51% of the population.

There were 151 households, out of which 32.5% had children under the age of 18 living with them, 53.6% were married couples living together, 13.9% had a female householder with no husband present, and 30.5% were non-families. 21.9% of all households were made up of individuals, and 13.2% had someone living alone who was 65 years of age or older. The average household size was 2.41 and the average family size was 2.78.

In the village, the population was spread out, with 22.8% under the age of 18, 6.4% from 18 to 24, 25.4% from 25 to 44, 25.4% from 45 to 64, and 20.0% who were 65 years of age or older. The median age was 41 years. For every 100 females, there were 90.2 males. For every 100 females age 18 and over, there were 87.0 males.

The median income for a household in the village was $39,375, and the median income for a family was $42,500. Males had a median income of $25,893 versus $20,313 for females. The per capita income for the village was $16,281. About 17.0% of families and 17.6% of the population were below the poverty line, including 25.6% of those under age 18 and 10.7% of those age 65 or over.

References

External links
 Village of Hobart official website
 "Capture Nature in the Catskills", New York Magazine, February 2009

Villages in New York (state)
Villages in Delaware County, New York